Robin Chase is an American transportation entrepreneur. She is co-founder and former CEO of Zipcar. She is also the founder and former CEO of Buzzcar, a peer-to-peer car-sharing service, acquired by Drivy. She also started the defunct GoLoco.org, a vehicle for hire company. She is co-founder and executive chairman of Veniam, a vehicle network communications company. She authored the book, Peers Inc: How People and Platforms are Inventing the Collaborative Economy and Reinventing Capitalism.

Early life
Chase spent her childhood in the Middle East and graduated from Waterford Kamhlaba United World College of Southern Africa, Wellesley College (B.A.), and the MIT Sloan School of Management (M.B.A.), and won a Loeb Fellowship at the Harvard Graduate School of Design.

Career
In 2000, Chase co-founded Zipcar with Antje Danielson. In January 2001, Chase fired Danielson after she petitioned Zipcar's board for the ability to make hiring and firing decisions without consulting them. In February 2003, after difficulties in securing additional rounds of funding, Chase was replaced as CEO by the Zipcar board with Scott Griffith.

In addition to Veniam, Chase is currently a board member for the World Resources Institute, and chairperson of the board for the Nasdaq and TSE listed Tucows Inc.

Formerly, she served on the board of the Massachusetts Department of Transportation, was a member of the World Economic Forum's Transportation Council, a member of the National Advisory Council on Innovation and Entrepreneurship, the US Department of Transportation Intelligent Transportation Systems Program Advisory Committee, the Boston Mayor's Wireless Task Force, and Governor Deval Patrick's Transportation Transition Team.

She has appeared in national media such as the Today Show, The New York Times, National Public Radio, Wired, Newsweek and Time magazines, and has been mentioned in several books on entrepreneurship.

Chase is a proponent for the creation of a mesh network so that end-user devices can create a shared wireless network. She is a proponent of expanding internet access, and participated in the InternetforEveryone kick-off event.

Awards
Chase has won several awards. She was listed as one of Time's 100 Most Influential People in 2009, received the Massachusetts Governor's Award for Entrepreneurial Spirit, Start-up Woman of the Year, Business Week’s top 10 designers, Fast Company's Fast 50 Champions of Innovation, technology and innovation awards from Fortune, CIO, and InfoWorld magazines, and numerous environmental awards from national, state and local governments and organizations.

References

External links
 Wired interview by David Weinberger
 Visionaries: Zipcar Founder Sees Success In Sharing
 
 TED Talks: Robin Chase on Zipcar and her next big idea (TED2007)
 Internet for Everyone Kickoff
 Profile from Technology Review
 Share a car; save the world
 Chasing away urban congestion
 On the go with a Transportation Entrepreneur
 The future of the car
 Zipcar Founder Tells How GoLoco Will Make Carpooling Hip, Too
 Robin Chase

Year of birth missing (living people)
Living people
Businesspeople from Cambridge, Massachusetts
MIT Sloan School of Management alumni
Wellesley College alumni
Harvard University people
Waterford Kamhlaba alumni
People educated at a United World College
American technology chief executives
American computer businesspeople
American technology company founders
American women company founders
American transportation businesspeople
American chairpersons of corporations
American corporate directors
21st-century American businesspeople
American Internet company founders
21st-century American women